John Wroth may refer to:

John Acton Wroth (1830–1876), convict transportee to the Swan River Colony, Australia
John Wroth (mayor), Lord Mayor of London in 1360
John Wroth (died 1396), MP for Middlesex and Wiltshire
John Wroth (died 1407), MP for Middlesex (UK Parliament constituency)
Sir John Wroth, 1st Baronet (1627–1664), English landowner
Sir John Wroth, 2nd Baronet (1653–1677), of the Wroth baronets
John Wroth (MP for Liverpool) (died after July 1616), MP for Liverpool (UK Parliament constituency)  in 1593

See also
Wroth (surname)